The Worldwide Address Service, abbreviated as Sedamo, is an Internet-based service for conveying postal addresses (mailing addresses) especially in non-Latin characters (such as Chinese, Japanese, or Korean). Any postal address gets a unique eight-letter code, the Sedamo address code, which can be used to retrieve the original address in native writing.

Background 

Especially people from the Asian world face the problem that Westerners cannot write postal addresses in Asian scripts. Though work-arounds exist (such as writing the address using a romanization), these are error-prone and slow down the postal delivery, due to two reasons:
(1) Romanisations of Chinese, Japanese, Thai etc. contains ambiguities, thus, a romanised address cannot be re-translated into the original language.
(2) The postmen in the destination countries are not used to recognise addresses written in a foreign (Latin) alphabet. (The situation can be compared to a US-American mailman who has to decipher an address written in Chinese transcription.)

The service d´adresse mondial offers an easy way to ensure correctly written and formatted addresses. The address can be retrieved from the sedamo web site as an image (bitmap) and can be printed directly onto an envelope or address label. The letter-sending user has not to install any special software or foreign language font.

The service d´adresse mondial is operated by the Cross-Cultural Communication Club (CCCC), a charity registered in London, UK. Using sedamo via the web site is for free; the operation is financed by donations.

Usage 

In the first step, the receiver looks up the sedamo address code of the destination address. This code is forwarded to the sender.

In the second step, the sender uses the code to print out the foreign address in an international format (as recommended by the Universal Postal Union). The sedamo system automatically generates a romanisation of any address. This romanisation can be used if an express company only accepts addresses written in Latin.

The sedamo Address Code 

The sedamo address code consists of eight letters, e.g.,  CT-QP-ED-TP (which is the code for the Hall of Prayer for Good Harvests inside the Temple of Heaven, Beijing, PRC). The dashes are for better readability only and can be omitted. The code may contain any Latin letter but "I" (which can be mistaken for "1" or "J"), N (similar to "M"), "O" ("0"), "S" ("5"), "V" ("U" or "W"), and "Z" ("2").
The code contains a check digit, simple errors such as a single mistyped letter, or the permutation of two successive letters does not lead to a wrong address but an error message. Moreover, neighbouring addresses get strongly different codes which shall prevent
mistakes.

The sedamo address code describes the address, not a receiver (person or company). The only exception is the code  AA-AA-AA-AA which directs to the address of the sedamo division of the Cross-Cultural Communication Club.

To mark sender's and receiver's address codes, a double arrow should be used: AA-AA-AA-AA >> CT-QP-ED-TP. For automation purposes, the CCCC suggests to print the code in Code 39 barcode with a leading "%+" (percent sign followed by plus sign) for the receiver's code and a "%-" (percent sign followed by minus sign) for the sender's code without dashes. For the example given above: *%-AAAAAAAA%+CTQPEDTP* or *%+CTQPEDTP%-AAAAAAAA*

sedamo-based services 

 eMail2address
The web site email2address.com supports registering one's own e-Mail address in conjunction with the sedamo address code. After registration, the e-Mail address (electronic address) can be used to retrieve the sedamo address code (and thus the postal/physical address).

 sedamo-based software
The Cross-Cultural Communication Club (CCCC), the operator of sedamo, licenses technology to software developers for accessing the sedamo database. This software can be used to retrieve addresses and to print address labels and waybills. The access to the sedamo database is controlled by username, password, and transaction authentication numbers (TANs) which are provided by the software developer who licensed the sedamo technology, not by the CCCC itself.

Examples of application 

sedamo address codes have been used in the book "ChinaBridgeBUSINESS", a trilingual business guide for China and Europe. The addresses of government departments, trade organisations, etc. are given in Latin transcription only and the reader can get the native address as described above.

Using the corresponding sedamo codes and  the App "ChinaBridgeMOBILE"  the users can store addresses on their smartphones and display them offline in large characters, e.g. when communicating with the local taxi driver.  This helps on individual trips without knowing the local language.

References

External links 
 web site of the service d'adresse mondial
 web site eMail2address.com

Address (geography)
Organisations based in London